Eshowe is the oldest town of European settlement in Zululand,  historically also known as Eziqwaqweni, Ekowe or kwaMondi. Eshowe's name is said to be inspired by the sound of wind blowing through the more than 4 km² of the indigenous Dlinza Forest, the most important and striking feature of the town. Although the name is most likely to be derived from the Zulu word for the Xysmalobium shrubs, showe or shongwe.

Today Eshowe is a market town, with a 100 km radius catchment area, two shopping centres, a main bus station serving the hinterland, a major hospital, and several schools.

History
In 1860 Cetshwayo, then only a Zulu prince, built a kraal here and named the place Eziqwaqweni (the abode of robbers).
A mission station was established at Eshowe in 1861 once permission had been obtained from the Zulu King Cetshwayo by Norwegian missionary, the Reverend Ommund Oftebro. Later the station was called the KwaMondi Mission Station (place of Mondi) after the Zulu name which was given to Oftebro.

Siege of Eshowe 

During the Anglo-Zulu War of 1879, Colonel Charles Pearson led the coastal column to Eshowe. This column encountered part of the Zulu army at the Nyezane River, but after a short battle pushed on to the KwaMondi Mission which was fortified and called Fort Ekowe.  The forces under Colonel Pearson were besieged for 10 weeks until relieved on April 3 by Lord Chelmsford after the Battle of Gingindlovu.

After the British left, Eshowe was burned down by the Zulus.

Capital of Zululand 
After the war Eshowe was established as the capital of Zululand and the home of the British resident in Zululand, Melmoth Osborne. The nearby town of Melmoth is named after him.

In 1887 Eshowe became the capital of Zululand and was officially declared a township in 1891.

In 1947 the British Royal Family (King George VI, Queen Elizabeth, Princess Elizabeth and Princess Margaret) visited and were welcomed in Eshowe by King Cyprian.  The family toured the Dlinza Forest and spent a night in 'The Residency' in Eshowe.

Eshowe served as the seat of the first Black Diocesan Bishops in South Africa, of the Anglican and Roman Catholic Church. Eshowe is still the seat of the Bishop of the Anglican Diocese of Zululand.

Nearby nature conservation areas
 iSimangaliso Wetland Park
 Hluhluwe-Umfolozi Game Reserve
 Itala Game Reserve
 Lubombo Transfrontier Conservation Area

Notable people
 Malusi Gigaba - politician, former national minister
 Dawn Thandeka King - actress
 Culoe De Song - music producer, DJ, recording artist
 Linda Sibiya (Mr. Magic) - former radio DJ, motivational speaker, TV personality, businessman
 Phindile Gwala - actress

References

External links

Tourism vendor in Eshowe
More information about Eshowe

Populated places in the uMlalazi Local Municipality
Populated places established in 1880
1880 establishments in South Africa